Edward "Eddie" Crook Jr. (April 19, 1929 – July 25, 2005) won a gold medal for the United States as a boxing teammate of Muhammad Ali in the 1960 Summer Olympics. Crook was also a member of Omega Psi Phi fraternity.

Amateur career 
Boxing out of Detroit, Crook was an Olympic gold medalist for the United States at the 1960 Olympic Games in Rome, in the 165 pound class. Crook defeated Tadeusz Walasek of Poland in the gold medal match by 3-2 decision. Reportedly he was the only Army boxer to ever win an Olympic gold medal. He had no professional career.

1960 Olympic results
Below is the record of Eddie Crook, Jr., an American middleweight boxer who competed at the 1960 Rome Olympics:

 Round of 32: defeated Fidel Odreman (Venezuela) by a first-round knockout
 Round of 16: defeated Peter Odhiambo (Uganda) by decision, 5-0
 Quarterfinal: defeated Chang Lo-pu (Formosa) by a third-round knockout
 Semifinal: defeated Ion Monea (Romania) by a second-round knockout
 Final: defeated Tadeusz Walasek (Poland) by decision, 3-2 (won gold medal)

Life after boxing 
After winning his gold medal, Crook served two tours in the Vietnam War as a command sergeant major in the U.S. Army. He received two Purple Hearts, a Silver Star, two Bronze Stars and an Air Medal and was a boxing coach at Fort Benning, Georgia. Crook was quarterback of the Berlin Bears, earning All-Army honors and named "Most Valuable Player." He earned a degree in Business Management from Troy State University. Crook then served as ROTC Instructor at Alcorn State in Mississippi.

Death 
Crook died on July 25, 2005, of natural causes in Montgomery, Alabama. He was 76. Crook and his wife Fannie Marie Rogers were buried at the Fort Benning Main Post Cemetery. They had eight children and seventeen grandchildren.

References

External links 
AP obituary via Yahoo!

1929 births
2005 deaths
Boxers from Detroit
American male boxers
Middleweight boxers
Olympic boxers of the United States
Boxers at the 1960 Summer Olympics
Olympic gold medalists for the United States in boxing
Medalists at the 1960 Summer Olympics
United States Army non-commissioned officers
United States Army personnel of the Vietnam War
Recipients of the Air Medal
Recipients of the Silver Star
Troy University alumni